Oedemera podagrariae, common name false blister beetle, is a quite common species of beetles belonging to the family Oedemeridae subfamily Oedemerinae.

Description
The head is black. Thorax is black in the male and yellow in the female. Elytra are yellow, ochre-coloured or light brown, sometimes with darker sides. Legs are entirely or at least partially yellow. The male of Oedemera podagrariae, as in most Oedemera species, possesses the hind femora very swollen, whereas in female the femora are thin.

Distribution
These beetles are present in most of Europe and in the Near East.

Subspecies and varietas
 Oedemera podagrariae podagrariae (Linnaeus, 1767)
 Oedemera podagrariae var. femoralis Seidl.
 Oedemera podagrariae var. flavicrus Saidl.
 Oedemera podagrariae var. obscura Ganglbauer
 Oedemera podagrariae var. schmidti Gemminger
 Oedemera podagrariae var. sericans Mulsant

References
 
 Vazquez, X. A. 2002. European Fauna of Oedemeridae - Argania editio, Barcelona, 179 pp.

External links
 Atlas of beetles of Russia
 Aramel

Oedemeridae
Beetles of Asia
Beetles of Europe
Beetles described in 1767
Taxa named by Carl Linnaeus